Umesh Gautam (born 30 June 1970) is an Indian politician of the Bharatiya Janata Party (BJP).  He is the Mayor of Bareilly and Chancellor of Invertis University.

Early life and  education

Umesh Gautam was born on 30 June 1970 in the family of K K Gautam in Uttar Pradesh, India. He did his Doctor of Philosophy from the Universit Popolare di Milano, Milan, Italy.

References 

Bharatiya Janata Party politicians from Delhi
Living people
1970 births
21st-century Indian politicians
20th-century Indian politicians
People from Bareilly district